This is a list of musicians from British Columbia.

A

 Jeff Abel
 Tommy Alto
 Carolyn Arends

B

 Ashleigh Ball
 Dan Bejar
 Doug Bennett
 Barney Bentall
 Art Bergmann
 Geoff Berner
 Kim Bingham
 Claire Boucher
 Dean Brody
 Chad Brownlee
 Michael Bublé
 Louise Burns

C

 Kathryn Calder
 Torquil Campbell
 Warren Cann
 Michelle Creber
 Allison Crowe

D

 Mac DeMarco

F

 Stephen Fearing
 Jon-Rae Fletcher
 Roy Forbes
 Frazey Ford
 David Foster
 Nelly Furtado

G

 Hannah Georgas
 Jody Glenham
 Matthew Good

H

 Tim Hecker
 Bill Henderson
 Veda Hille
 Jacob Hoggard
 Chris Hooper
 Tom Hooper
 Paul Hyde
 Joshua Hyslop

J

 Ingrid Jensen
 Carly Rae Jepsen
 Vincent Jones

K
 Kevin Kane
 Joey "Shithead" Keithley
 Geoffrey Kelly
 Brad Kent
 Diana Krall
 Kyprios

L

 Tom Landa
 Sook-Yin Lee
 Alex Lifeson
 Suzanne Little

M

 Brian MacLeod
 Madchild
 Dan Mangan
 John Mann
 Carolyn Mark
 Sarah McLachlan
 Hugh McMillan
 Carey Mercer
 Mae Moore
 Scott Morgan
 Bob Murphy

N

 Bif Naked
 Nardwuar the Human Serviette
 Darryl Neudorf
 A. C. Newman

O

 Oh Susanna
 Neil Osborne

P

 Brandon Paris
 Daniel Powter
 Prevail

R

 Josh Ramsay
 Bob Rock

T

 Kristy Thirsk
 Philip J. Thomas
 Devin Townsend

U

 Shari Ulrich
 David Usher

W

 Daniel Wesley

See also
List of bands from British Columbia

British Columbia